Worteh Sampson (born 25 June 1981 in Monrovia, Liberia) is a Liberian soccer coach who is currently the head coach of the University of Michigan–Dearborn men's soccer team.

College
In 2001, Sampson received a scholarship to play at Schoolcraft College in Michigan before receiving another 2-year grant to play at Madonna University in Michigan beginning in 2003. He "was named to the All-Conference First Team twice, while also being named the Conference Player of the Year in 2003." He graduated in 2005 with a bachelor's degree in Marketing.

Professional
Sampson began his career in 2006 with Windsor Border Stars of the Canadian Soccer League. He recorded his first goal for the club on September 9, 2006, in a match against London City.  He scored his second goal the following match against Caribbean Selects. He helped Windsor clinch a postseason berth by finishing third in the National Division. In the playoffs, he recorded a goal in a 2–1 victory over Oakville Blue Devils. In the second round of the postseason the club was eliminated from the competition after losing to Serbian White Eagles.

The Detroit Ignition of Major Indoor Soccer League (MISL) drafted Sampson in 2006.  He played for the Ignition for three straight seasons, starting with 2006–07.  For the 2008–09 season, the team played in the Xtreme Soccer League.

In 2008, Sampson signed with the Charlotte Eagles of the USL Second Division.

Sampson played the 2010–11 MISL season for the Baltimore Blast, scoring 8 goals and 8 assists in 14 regular games.  In 2011, he moved to the Detroit Waza.

Coaching 
In 2019, Sampson was hired as the head coach for University of Michigan–Dearborn's men's soccer team, after coaching at many other levels for several years.

Career team achievements
1st Place in Michigan with Schoolcraft College 2001.
Midwest Champions with Schoolcraft College 2001.
6th Place in the National Division 1 (NJCAA) Final Tournament in Tyler, Texas with Schoolcraft College.
2nd Place in Michigan with Schoolcraft College 2002.
Midwest Champions with Schoolcraft College 2002.
3rd Place in the National Division 1 (NJCAA) Final Tournament in Tyler, Texas with Schoolcraft College.

Career personal achievements
2003 NAIA (WHAC) player of the year with Madonna University
2003 NAIA All Region and All All American
2003 Madonna University Offensive Player of the year
2003 Runner up Madonna University Athlete of the year
2004 NAIA All Region and All American
2004 Madonna University Player of the year

References

1981 births
Living people
Association football forwards
Baltimore Blast (2008–2014 MISL) players
Charlotte Eagles players
Detroit Ignition (MISL) players
Detroit Ignition (XSL) players
Detroit Waza players
Windsor City FC players
Expatriate soccer players in the United States
Liberian expatriate footballers
Liberian expatriate sportspeople in the United States
Liberian footballers
Madonna University alumni
Canadian Soccer League (1998–present) players
Major Indoor Soccer League (2001–2008) players
Sportspeople from Monrovia
Schoolcraft College alumni
USL Second Division players
Xtreme Soccer League players
Major Arena Soccer League players
University of Michigan–Dearborn people
College men's soccer coaches in the United States
College women's soccer coaches in the United States
Expatriate soccer managers in the United States